is a Japanese anime television series.

References

External links

1988 anime television series debuts
Nippon Animation